Kathleen Shannon (born 20 September 1964) is a former Australian racing cyclist. She won the Australian national road race title in 1990 and 1991. 
She won a bronze medal in the road race at the 1990 Commonwealth Games.

She also competed in the road race at the 1988 and 1992 Summer Olympics.

References

External links
 

1964 births
Living people
Australian female cyclists
Place of birth missing (living people)
Olympic cyclists of Australia
Cyclists at the 1988 Summer Olympics
Cyclists at the 1992 Summer Olympics
Commonwealth Games medallists in cycling
Commonwealth Games bronze medallists for Australia
Cyclists at the 1990 Commonwealth Games
Medallists at the 1990 Commonwealth Games